John Edward Hollister Montagu, 11th Earl of Sandwich (born 11 April 1943), is a British entrepreneur, politician and nobleman. He has sat in the House of Lords on the crossbenches since 1995.

Biography
Lord Sandwich is the eldest son of Victor Montagu, who disclaimed the earldom of Sandwich in 1964, and his first wife Rosemary Maud (née Peto). He succeeded his father to the earldom in 1995 and is one of the ninety elected hereditary peers that remain in the House of Lords after the passing of the House of Lords Act 1999. He sits as a crossbencher and speaks mainly on international development and asylum issues.

Lord Sandwich was educated at Eton College and Trinity College, Cambridge. His seat is Mapperton House in Dorset.

Reflecting the fame of one of his ancestors, the 4th Earl of Sandwich (after whom the sandwich was named in the 18th century), the current Lord Sandwich licensed the use of his title for a chain of sandwich shops, Earl of Sandwich. These are located in various parts of the United States, including Disney Springs Marketplace in Walt Disney World Resort, under an agreement chiefly with Robert Earl, founder of the Planet Hollywood chain.

Marriage and children
Lord Sandwich married (Susan) Caroline Hayman, daughter of The Reverend Canon Perceval Hayman, on 1 July 1968. She is a former business journalist and policy expert at the European Commission, specialising in the Middle East. She is a committee member of a number of organisations promoting links with the region, including the Saudi British Society, and is a senior adviser for Women in Business International. She is also active in a number of organisations in Dorset, including the Heritage Lottery Fund's South West Committee and the Beaminster Festival, and serves as President of the Dorset Natural History & Archaeological Society.

They have three children:
Luke Timothy Charles Montagu, Viscount Hinchingbrooke (born 5 December 1969). He married Julie Fisher (born 17 February 1972) from Sugar Grove, Illinois, United States, on 11 June 2004. In addition to a daughter and son (Emma Fisher, born approx 1999, and Jack Fisher, born approx 2001) from Fisher's previous marriage, they have two sons:
The Hon. William James Hayman Montagu (born 2 November 2004)
The Hon. Nestor John Sturges Montagu (born 2006)
The Hon. Orlando William Montagu (born 16 January 1971). He married firstly Laura Roundell in 1996; they divorced in 2002 without issue. On 3 July 2004, Montagu married Lady Honor Wellesley, eldest daughter of the 9th Duke of Wellington, with whom he has two children:
Walter Frederick Montagu (born 3 December 2005)
Nancy Jemima Montagu (born 18 January 2007)
Lady Jemima Mary Montagu (born 14 October 1973). In 2013, she married Fisnik Abrashi.

Notes

References

External links

The Earl of Sandwich article on its opening at The Disney Corner
Earl of Sandwich link to the website for the restaurant Earl of Sandwich

1943 births
Living people
People educated at Eton College
Alumni of Trinity College, Cambridge
John Montagu, 11th Earl of Sandwich 
British businesspeople
Crossbench hereditary peers
Earls of Sandwich
Hereditary peers elected under the House of Lords Act 1999